Kranthi Madhav is an Indian writer and director known for his work in Telugu film industry. He has directed films like Malli Malli Idi Rani Roju and Ungarala Rambabu.

Personal life 
Kranthi Madhav was born in Khammam and brought up in Warangal.  His professor A.F. Mathews introduced him to film making. He completed his post-graduation in 2002 and had two offers. One was to work in a national channel for a salary of ₹12K or to work in Ramoji film city for a salary of ₹4.5K. His father suggested that he should take the RFC job because it would keep him near to the goal of becoming a filmmaker. Later on he has worked in related companies like UGC, Rediffusion, Radio Mirchi and Vyjayanthi Movies before becoming an independent film director. He has cited Guru Dutt, T. Krishna, and K. Balachander as his inspirations.

Career

Filmography

Awards and nominations 
 CineMAA Award for Best Debut Director - Kranthi Madhav
 Chennai Telugu Academy Awards - Kranthi Madhav - Best Feature Film
 Santosham Awards- Kranthi Madhav- Best Feature Film
 ANR - Abhinandana Awards - Best Feature Film, Best Debut Director - Kranthi Madhav
 Bharatamuni Awards - Best Message Oriented Film, Best Debut Director - Kranthi Madhav
 Best Home-viewing Feature Film (Gold)
Kranthi Madhav in  2015 Nandi Awards
 Nominated for  Best Director — Telugu Kranthi Madhav in 63rd Filmfare Awards South

References

Sources
 Kranti Madhav
 I was inspired by my professor: Kranthi Madhav
 Kranthi Madhav interview - Telugu film director

External links 
 

Telugu film directors
Living people
Telugu film producers
Film directors from Andhra Pradesh
Film producers from Andhra Pradesh
Year of birth missing (living people)